James Douglas Henderson (13 October 1918 — 14 August 2004) was a Scottish first-class cricketer and educator.

Henderson was born in October 1918 at Kelso. He was educated at Forfar Academy, before matriculating to the University of St Andrews. A club cricketer for Forfarshire Cricket Club, Henderson made his debut for Scotland in first-class cricket against Ireland at Greenock in 1946. He played first-class cricket for Scotland until 1956, making fourteen appearances; eight of these came in the annual match against Ireland, while a further six came against English first-class counties. Playing as an all-rounder in the Scottish side, he scored 429 runs at an average of 22.57; he made one century, a score of 121 against Ireland in 1954, forming a partnership of 187 runs with William Edward for the eighth wicket. With his left-arm medium pace bowling, he took 29 wickets at a bowling average of 22.41; he took one five wicket haul, with figures of 5 for 27 against Ireland in 1952. By profession, Henderson was a schoolmaster. He died at Forfar in August 2004.

References

External links
 

1918 births
2004 deaths
People from Kelso, Scottish Borders
People educated at Forfar Academy
Alumni of the University of St Andrews
Scottish schoolteachers
Scottish cricketers